WD repeat containing protein 53 (WDR53) is a protein encoded by the WDR53 gene that has been identified in the human genome by the Human Genome Project but has, at the moment, lacked experimental procedures to understand the function. It is located on chromosome 3 at location 3q29 in Homo sapiens. It has short up and down stream untranslated regions as well as WD40 repeat regions which have been linked to various functions (signal transduction, transcription regulation, apoptosis etc.).

Expression 
In H. sapiens, it has been shown to be highly expressed in the tissue of the testes with low, almost untraceable, expression in other tissues.

Gene 
WDR53 transcribes an mRNA with 1701 base pairs. This gene is on the negative strand of chromosome 3 and has four exons. The mRNA has a promoter labeled GXP_232341 from Genomatix and is 1253 bp long.

mRNA 
WDR53 can be alternately spliced into 6 different mRNA products.

Protein 
The translated protein from WDR53 contains seven identifiable WD40 regions encoded by 358 amino acids. The protein product is 38.99 kDa.

Subcellular Localization 

WDR53 has been predicted to be localized in the nucleus of cells. The protein even possesses one nuclear localization signal.

Structure 
The secondary structure of WDR53 has been predicted to be predominantly alternations between loops and strands with little to no helices. These WD40 regions fold into a tertiary propeller like structure that has been conserved in multiple different genes across the human genome as well as other Eukaryotas. These seven repeats form into a cone like shape in which the center depression most likely acts as a binding point for other proteins.

Interacting Proteins 
There are two likely proteins that interact with WDR53: WDR5 and MCPH1. Each of these proteins possess regions that have a high likelihood of forming and association with WDR53. Both proteins are expressed in the testes as well which strengthens the likelihood of there being a true association.

Post-translational Modifications 
WDR53 undergoes protein modifications such as phosphorylation, sumoylation, and glycosylation.

Homology 
Because WD40 repeats are conserved across many eukaryotes, WDR53 is also conserved among many eukaryotes even into certain members of the plantae kingdom such as the Apple.

References

Human genes
Human proteins